Gresslyosaurus (meaning "Amanz Gressly's lizard") is a genus of plateosaurian sauropodomorph dinosaur that lived during the Late Triassic period, around 214 to 204 million years ago, in Switzerland.

Taxonomy
Gresslyosaurus was originally dubbed "Dinosaurus gresslyi" by Rütimeyer (1856) on the basis of postcranial remains discovered in the Late Triassic (late Norian-Rhaetian) Knollenmergel of northern Switzerland around 1840 by Amanz Gressly, but that name is a nomen nudum as it was described in an abstract. Dinosaurus anyway was already in use for a therapsid, so Rütimeyer (1857) formally described the material as Gresslyosaurus ingens. Lydekker (1888) synonymized Gresslyosaurus with Zanclodon, but von Huene (1908) removed sauropodomorph material assigned to Zanclodon (which he assigned to Theropoda) and Gresslyosaurus along with Plateosaurus as sauropodomorphs. A number of authors (e.g. Steel 1970) listed Gresslyosaurus as valid, but Galton (1976, 1985, 1986) synonymized it with Plateosaurus based on comparisons with Plateosaurus material from Germany. Moser (2003), however, found Gresslyosaurus to be generically distinct from Plateosaurus, and in their description of Schleitheimia, Rauhut et al. (2020) found a number of differences between Schleitheimia and Gresslyosaurus.

References

Sauropodomorphs
Clawed herbivores
Late Triassic genus first appearances
Late Triassic genus extinctions
Late Triassic dinosaurs of Europe
Fossils of Switzerland
Fossil taxa described in 1857